The 1965–66 BBC2 Floodlit Trophy was the inaugural season of the BBC2 Floodlit Trophy competition. Castleford won the trophy by beating St. Helens with the score of 4–0. The match was played at Knowsley Road, Eccleston, St Helens, Merseyside. The attendance was 11,510 and receipts were £3,548. This was to be the first of Castleford's three victories in successive seasons in the first three Floodlit competitions.

Background 
This season there were a total of only eight teams entering, all by invite, playing a total of eleven matches for which the BBC paid the RFL a grand total of £9,000.00. The entrants included the seven clubs with permanent floodlights: Castleford, Leigh, Oldham, St Helens, Swinton, Warrington and Widnes together with Leeds, who installed floodlights in September 1966. The competition was played in the form of a mini-league with the semi-finals and final stages being on a knock out basis.

Competition and results

Qualifying rounds
Each team played two matches in the qualifying round. All teams played one home game each except Leeds, who played both games away from home as their floodlights were not installed yet.

The four teams with the best points difference qualified for the semi finals.

Round 1

Round 2

Table

Pos = Finishing position   P = Games played   W = Wins   D = Draw   L = Lose
PF = Points scored   PA = Points against   Pts = League points   PD = Points scored difference

Semi-finals

Final

Teams and scorers 

Scoring - Try = three (3) points - Goal = two (2) points - Drop goal = two (2) points

The  play-offs

Notes and comments 
Knowsley Road was the home of St Helens R.F.C. from 1890 until its closure in 2010. The final capacity was 17,500 although the record attendance was 35,695 set on 26 December 1949 for a league game between St Helens and Wigan.

General information 
The Rugby League BBC2 Floodlit Trophy was a knock-out competition sponsored by the BBC and between rugby league clubs, entrance to which was conditional upon the club having floodlights. Most matches were played on an evening, and those of which the second half was televised, were played on a Tuesday evening.

Despite the competition being named as 'Floodlit', many matches took place during the afternoons and not under floodlights, and several of the entrants, including Barrow and Bramley, did not have adequate lighting. When in 1973, due to the world oil crisis, the government restricted the use of floodlights in sport, all of the matches, including the Trophy final, had to be played in the afternoon rather than at night. The Rugby League season always (until the onset of "Summer Rugby" in 1996) ran from around August-time through to around May-time and this competition always took place early in the season, in the Autumn, with the final taking place in December (the only exception to this was when disruption of the fixture list was caused by inclement weather).

See also 
1965–66 Northern Rugby Football League season
1965 Lancashire Cup
1965 Yorkshire Cup
BBC2 Floodlit Trophy
Rugby league county cups

References

External links
Saints Heritage Society
1896–97 Northern Rugby Football Union season at wigan.rlfans.com
Hull&Proud Fixtures & Results 1896/1897
Widnes Vikings - One team, one passion Season In Review - 1896-97
The Northern Union at warringtonwolves.org
Huddersfield R L Heritage

BBC2 Floodlit Trophy
BBC2 Floodlit Trophy